In geometry, a uniform coloring is a property of a uniform figure (uniform tiling or uniform polyhedron) that is colored to be vertex-transitive. Different symmetries can be expressed on the same geometric figure with the faces following different uniform color patterns.

A uniform coloring can be specified by listing the different colors with indices around a vertex figure.

n-uniform figures 
In addition, an n-uniform coloring is a property of a uniform figure which has n types vertex figure, that are collectively vertex transitive.

Archimedean coloring
A related term is Archimedean color requires one vertex figure coloring repeated in a periodic arrangement. A more general term are k-Archimedean colorings which count k distinctly colored vertex figures.

For example, this Archimedean coloring (left) of a triangular tiling has two colors, but requires 4 unique colors by symmetry positions and become a 2-uniform coloring (right):

References 
  Uniform and Archimedean colorings, pp. 102–107

External links 

 Uniform Tessellations on the Euclid plane
 Tessellations of the Plane
 David Bailey's World of Tessellations
 k-uniform tilings
 n-uniform tilings

Uniform tilings
Polyhedra